Old Assyrian refers to the Old Assyrian period of the Ancient Near East, ca. 20th to 16th centuries BC (the Middle Bronze Age). It may refer to:
The Old Assyrian Empire
The Old Assyrian language
Old Assyrian cuneiform, see Cuneiform script

See also
Middle Assyrian (disambiguation)
Neo-Assyrian (Early Iron Age)

Language and nationality disambiguation pages